This article represents the discography of progressive bluegrass band Nickel Creek. They have released six studio albums, one compilation album, as well as eight singles. Their debut live album was announced on October 2, 2020.

Nickel Creek's first widely known album, Nickel Creek, was released in 2001. It charted within the Top 20 of the Billboard Top Country Albums charts. The album featured three singles: "When You Come Back Down", "The Lighthouse's Tale", and "Reasons Why". The first two charted to number 48 and number 49 on the Billboard Hot Country Songs charts, whereas the third single failed to chart. Also in 2001, the band were featured with Dolly Parton on "Shine", a cover of the pop group Collective Soul's signature song. The song was released as a single from Parton's album Little Sparrow, and also featured a music video. Nickel Creek was then certified Gold by the Recording Industry Association of America on February 4, 2004.

In 2003, they released their critically acclaimed album This Side. It was a success on the Top Country Albums chart, debuting and peaking at number 2, as well as their first album to chart within the Top 20 of the Billboard 200, where it reached number 18. It was also a number-one album on the Billboard Top Bluegrass Albums chart. The album only spawned one chart single with its title track. It peaked at number 56 on the country charts.

Their fifth studio album, Why Should the Fire Die?, was released in 2005. Like its predecessor, it too, made the Top 20 of the Billboard 200, but failed to enter the Top Country Albums chart. One single was released, "When in Rome," but it failed to chart.

The band's sixth studio album, A Dotted Line, was released April 1, 2014.

Nickel Creek announced the release of their latest studio album, Celebrants, to be released on March 24, 2023.  This album was recorded during the pandemic lockdown in February of 2021.  During the sessions, the band performed two live "Nickel Stream" concerts via Mandolin.

Studio albums

1990s

2000s

2010s

Compilation albums

Live albums

Singles

Featured singles

Videography

Music videos

Guest appearances

Collaborations
Bug - original motion picture soundtrack (2007) Sean & Sara Watkins - track #2 "No Way to Live"
Contributed mandolin and vocals to Circles (2006), a song on alternative/post-grunge band Switchfoot's album Oh! Gravity
Those Were The Days (2005) with Dolly Parton, featured on a cover of Blowin' in the Wind
Mutual Admiration Society (2004) with Glen Phillips
Little Worlds (2003) with Béla Fleck and the Flecktones, featured on Off the Top (The Gravity Wheel) and Off the Top (Line Dance)
Further Down The Old Plank Road (2003) with The Chieftains, featured on The Raggle Taggle Gypsy
Little Sparrow (2001) with Dolly Parton, featured on the single "Shine"

References

Country music discographies
Discographies of American artists